Kevin Bailey Hornberger (born June 26, 1981) is an American politician from the Republican party who is a member of the Maryland House of Delegates, representing District 35A.

Background 
Hornberger was born on June 26, 1981 in North East, Maryland. He graduated from Rising Sun High School in 1999 and attended Cecil College, where he earned an associate degree in general studies in 2003. He then attended the University of Maryland from 2003 to 2004, and later graduated with honors from the University of the District of Columbia with a B.S. degree in mechanical engineering in 2010.

After graduating, Hornberger founded his own company, Blue Collar Engineering Inc., and began working as a facility manager for the Library of Congress. In 2014, he ran for the Maryland House of Delegates in District 35A, challenging incumbent Democratic Delegate David D. Rudolph, who was drawn into the district following redistricting in 2012. He won the Republican primary with a 300-vote lead over his opponent. During the general election, he was endorsed by Republican gubernatorial nominee Larry Hogan and U.S. Representative Andy Harris. He defeated Rudolph in the general election with 56.5 percent of the vote.

In the legislature 
Hornberger was sworn in as a member of the House of Delegates on January 14, 2015. Since 2020, he has served as the Deputy Minority Whip.

Committee assignments 
 Member, Ways and Means Committee, 2015–present (education subcommittee, 2015–2018, 2021–present; finance resources subcommittee, 2015–2017, 2019; election law subcommittee, 2017–2018; local revenues subcommittee, 2019; early childhood subcommittee, 2020; racing & gaming subcommittee, 2020–present)
 Member, Joint Committee on Gaming Oversight, 2015–present

Other memberships 
 House Chair, Cecil County Delegation, 2015–present
 Member, Maryland Legislative Sportsmen's Caucus, 2015–present
 Member, Maryland Veterans Caucus, 2015–present
 Member, Maryland Legislative Transit Caucus, 2019–present

Personal life
Hornberger is married to his wife, Danielle, who currently serves as the county executive of Cecil County. Together, they have one child.

Political positions

Elections
Hornberger introduced legislation in the 2020 legislative session to require all vacancies in the Maryland General Assembly to be filled with special elections. In 2021, he proposed legislation to reform the state's campaign finance reporting system to include a real-time database.

Gun control
Hornberger identifies as "one of the fiercest advocates for the Second Amendment". During a debate on legislation to ban firearms on college campuses, Hornberger unsuccessfully introduced an amendment to exempt students or staff members who have concealed carry permits from the bill. Following the 2017 Las Vegas shooting, Hornberger voted in favor of legislation to ban bump stocks in Maryland, a vote which he later called "one of the toughest votes I've ever had to make". During a debate on legislation that prohibited life without parole sentences for juvenile offenders, Hornberger introduced an amendment that would exempt people "convicted of a crime involving the possession or discharge of a firearm inside a school building or a conspiracy to commit a crime involving a firearm inside a school building", which was rejected by a vote of 51-83.

Marijuana
Hornberger opposed legislation introduced in the 2017 legislation to legalize recreational marijuana, saying he supported medical marijuana but felt it was too early to legalize recreational marijuana. During the 2021 legislative session, Hornberger introduced legislation that would allow medical marijuana patients to possess and carry firearms.

Minimum wage
During a debate on legislation to raise the state minimum wage to $15 an hour in 2019, Hornberger unsuccessfully introduced an amendment to increase funding for health and human service organizations.

Social issues
During the 2021 legislative session, Hornberger co-sponsored legislation that would give farmers the right to repair equipment.

Taxes
In 2018, Hornberger campaigned on cutting Maryland's taxes. During the 2021 legislative session, he introduced legislation to provide tax refunds to business owners who had to close or reduce their operations as a result of the COVID-19 pandemic. In April of that year, Hornberger voted in favor of legislation that would let counties set bracket-based income taxes.

Electoral history

References

Republican Party members of the Maryland House of Delegates
1981 births
Living people
People from Cecil County, Maryland
21st-century American politicians